Santa Lucia Cloud Forest is a cloud forest reserve, located about 80 km northwest of Quito, in the province of Pichincha, in Ecuador. This is at the far south of the southern phase of the Choco-Andean Rainforest Corridor. Rainforest Concern works with the Santa Lucia co-operative, a community-based conservation organisation dedicated to conservation and to sustainable development so that they can make a modest living whilst conserving their remaining cloud forest.

The community-based organisation formed by local campesino families manage their own resources and they have three basic aims:

 to conserve and protect the cloud forest belonging to member families.
 to develop sustainable sources of income for the members of Santa Lucía.
 to benefit directly or indirectly the residents in neighboring areas.

External links 
 El Bosque Nublado Santa Lucia Conservation & Ecotourism Santa Lucia
 Santa Lucia Pics Volunteering in Santa Lucia
 Ecuador Ecotourism Rainforest Concern in Ecuador

Andean forests
Nature reserves in Ecuador
Geography of Pichincha Province
Forests of Ecuador
Tropical and subtropical moist broadleaf forests
Tropical Andes